The Missing Wife (German:Die verschwundene Frau) is a 1929 Austrian silent film comedy crime film directed by Karl Leiter and starring Harry Halm, Iris Arlan and Mary Kid. The sets were designed by the art director Hans Ledersteger.

The film is notable for marking the screen debut of Peter Lorre. The film was believed lost until 1984. It wasn't until it was restored in 1996 that Lorre's small role was noted. Lorre had never spoken about the film and always maintained that M (1931) was his first film, which was a breakthrough role as opposed to a brief, uncredited cameo.

Cast
 Harry Halm as Adam Bertram  
 Iris Arlan as Eva  
 Mary Kid as Dr. Med. Hanna Karsten  
 Peter C. Leska as Dr. Fritz Steiner  
 Reinhold Häussermann as Polizeirat Alois Hartl 
 Richard Waldemar as Tobias Ameisel 
 Albert Kersten 
 Clementine Plessner 
 Peter Lorre as Patient of a Dentist

References

Bibliography 
 Youngkin, Stephen. The Lost One: A Life of Peter Lorre. University Press of Kentucky, 2005.

External links 
 

1929 films
Austrian silent feature films
Austrian crime comedy films
1920s rediscovered films
1920s crime comedy films
Austrian black-and-white films
Rediscovered Austrian films
Silent crime comedy films
1920s German-language films